Laccophilus anticatus, is a species of predaceous diving beetle found in South and South East Asia.

Subspecies
Two subspecies have been identified.

 Laccophilus anticatus anticatus Sharp, 1890 - India, Bangladesh, Pakistan, Sri Lanka, Indonesia
 Laccophilus anticatus translucidus Régimbart, 1899 - Myanmar

The subspecies anticatus is a small glabrous beetle with a length of about 3 to 4 mm. Body dorsally subflattened with yellow and blackish patches.

Biology
They inhabited in marshy areas, shallow bodies of water rich in vegetation and small fauna as well as dense growth of filamentous alga, Spirogyra. Adults are active and spend most of their time submerged. beetles They are semigregarious and are found in societies. Abundance of the adults increased rapidly during the monsoon and post monosoon hot seasons where they are frequently found in temporary pools and weed infested ponds. Adult beetles can be used in biological control of mosquitoes.

References 

Dytiscidae
Insects of Sri Lanka
Insects described in 1890